The British Association of Clinical Anatomists is a Registered Charitable Company in the United Kingdom, dedicated to advancing the study of, and research into clinical anatomy for the public benefit.

History
 The Association was founded on 7 July 1977 at a meeting convened in London at the Royal College of Surgeons of England. R. E. Coupland was elected as President, R. M. H. McMinn appointed as Secretary, and D. Mayor as Treasurer.

Function
The Association holds two professional meetings each year dedicated to advancing the understanding of Clinical Anatomy.   It hosts a series of online webinars (BACA Beats) at which presentations by an expert in applied clinical anatomy will present a review of the current topics in the subject. It also contributes editorial content to the journal Clinical Anatomy.  Its mission is to achieve excellence in clinical anatomy for all health professionals and those engaged in teaching or research on the subject.

Structure
 The Society is a registered charitable company in the United Kingdom.

References

External links
 Official website

Medical associations based in the United Kingdom
Organizations established in 1977
British anatomists
1977 establishments in the United Kingdom